The discography of Dutch DJ and music producer R3hab consists of 2 studio albums and 117 singles, including 3 as a featured artist.

Albums

Studio albums

Singles

As lead artist

As featured artist

Edited singles

Promotional singles

Remixes

2010
 DJ Mujava - "Please Mugwanti" (R3hab Remix)
 Franky Rizardo - "Afrika" (R3hab and Ferruccio Salvo Remix)
 Rene Amesz - "Coriander" (Hardwell and R3hab Remix)
 G&G - "We Just Criticize" (R3hab and Addy Van Der Zwan Remix)
 DJ Norman vs. Darkraver - "Kom Tie Dan Hé" (R3hab and Addy van der Zwan Remix)
 Issy featuring David Goncalves - "Physical Love" (R3hab Remix)
 Critical Mass - "Burning Love" (R3hab Remix)
 Bob Sinclar featuring Sean Paul - "Tik Tok" (Chuckie and R3hab Remix)

2011
 Addy Van Der Zwan featuring The Michael Zager Band - "Let's All Chant" (R3hab Remix)
 Ian Carey featuring Snoop Dogg and Bobby Anthony – "Last Night" (R3hab Remix)
 MYNC and Abigail Bailey - "Something On Your Mind" (R3hab Remix)
 Pitbull featuring Ne-Yo, Afrojack and Nayer - "Give Me Everything" (R3hab Remix)
 Ralvero - "Drunk Tonight" (R3hab and Ferruccio Salvo Remix)
 Lady Gaga - "Judas" (R3hab Remix)
 Dada Life - "Fight Club Is Closed" (R3hab and Ferruccio Salvo Remix)
 Hyper Crush - "Kick Us Out" (R3hab and DJ Frank E Remix)
 Gloria Estefan - "Wepa" (R3hab Remix)
 Luciana - "I'm Still Hot" (R3hab Remix)
 Porcelain Black featuring Lil Wayne - This Is What Rock n Roll Looks Like (R3hab's Ruby Skye Remix)
 Cahill featuring Joel Edwards - "In Case I Fall" (R3hab Remix)
 LMFAO featuring Natalia Kills - "Champagne Showers" (R3hab Remix)
 Rye Rye featuring Robyn - "Never Will Be Mine" (R3hab Remix)
 Wynter Gordon - "Til Death" (R3hab Remix)
 Calvin Harris featuring Kelis - "Bounce" (R3hab Remix)
 Rihanna featuring Calvin Harris - "We Found Love" (R3hab's XS Remix)
 Sander Van Doorn - "Koko" (R3hab Remix)
 Tiësto - "Maximal Crazy" (R3hab and Swanky Tunes Remix)
 Taio Cruz - "Troublemaker" (R3hab Remix)
 Jennifer Lopez - "Papi" (R3hab Remix)
 Skylar Grey - "Dance Without You" (R3hab Remix)
 David Guetta featuring Usher - "Without You" (R3hab's XS Remix)
 Porcelain Black - "Naughty Naughty" (R3hab's 6AM Pacha Mix)
 Qwote and Lucenzo - "Danza Kuduro (Throw Your Hands Up)" (R3hab's Dayglow Remix)
 Lady Gaga - "Marry The Night" (R3hab Remix)
 Katy Perry - "The One That Got Away" (R3hab Remix)
 Benny Benassi featuring Gary Go - "Close To Me" (R3hab Remix)
 Kaskade featuring Mindy Gledhill - "Eyes" (R3hab Remix)
 Far East Movement - "Jello" (R3hab Remix)
 Dev and Enrique Iglesias - "Naked" (R3hab Remix)

2012
 LMFAO - "Sorry For Party Rocking" (R3hab Remix)
 Adrian Lux - "Fire" (R3hab's Bigroom Remix)
 will.i.am - "Go Home" (R3hab vs The Eye Remix)
 Karmin - "Brokenhearted" (R3hab's XS Remix)
 Cassie - "King of Hearts" (R3hab Remix)
 Labrinth - "Last Time" (R3hab Remix)
 R3hab vs. Denis Naidanow - "Shuri Shuri" (R3hab Remix)
 Eric Turner - "Angels & Stars" (R3hab Club Mix)
 David Guetta - "I Can Only Imagine" (R3hab Remix)
 Eva Simons - "I Don't Like You" (R3hab Remix)
 Cosmo - "Naughty Party" (R3hab Remix)
 Sebastian Ingrosso & Alesso - "Calling (Lose My Mind)" (R3hab & Swanky Tunes Chainsaw Madness Mix)
 Pitbull - "Back in Time" (R3hab Remix)
 Usher - "Scream" (R3hab Remix)
 Afrojack & Shermanology - "Can't Stop Me Now" (R3hab andDyro Remix)
 Jay Sean feat. Pitbull - "I'm All Yours" (R3hab Remix)
 Calvin Harris feat. Example - "We'll Be Coming Back" (R3hab EDC Vegas Remix)
 Calvin Harris feat. Example - "We'll Be Coming Back" (R3hab EDC NYC Remix)
 Madonna - "Turn Up The Radio" (R3hab's Surrender Remix)
 Adam Lambert - "Never Close Our Eyes" (R3hab Oldskool Bounce Remix)
 Taryn Manning - "Send Me Your Love" (R3hab Remix)
 Far East Movement feat. Cover Drive - "Turn Up the Love" (R3hab Remix)
 Enrique Iglesias - "Finally Found You" (R3hab and ZROQ Remix)
 Meital feat. Sean Kingston - "On Ya" (R3hab Remix)
 Pitbull featuring TJR - "Don't Stop The Party" (R3hab and ZROQ Remix)
 Cherry Cherry Boom Boom - "One and Only" (R3hab Remix)
 Michael Woods - "We've Only Just Begun" (R3hab and ZROQ Remix)
 Havana Brown feat. R3hab - "You'll Be Mine" (R3hab and ZROQ Remix)
 Priyanka Chopra - "In My City" (R3hab and ZROQ Remix)
 No Doubt - "Looking Hot" (R3hab Remix)
 Example - "Perfect Replacement" (R3hab and Hard Rock Sofa Remix)

2013
 Pitbull feat. Ke$ha - "Timber" (R3hab Remix)
 Diplo feat. Nicky Da B - "Express Yourself" (R3hab & Diplo Remix)
 Rihanna - "What Now" (R3hab Remix)
 The Wombats - "Your Body Is a Weapon" (R3hab Remix)
 Cole Plante - "Lie to Me" (R3hab Remix)
 Yoko Ono feat. Dave Audé - "Hold Me" (R3hab Remix)
 David Guetta feat. Ne-Yo and Akon - "Play Hard" (R3hab Remix)
 Tiësto - "Chasing Summers" (R3hab & Quintino Remix)
 7Lions - "Born 2 Run" (R3hab Remix)
 Just Ivy feat. Akon - "Paradise" (R3hab Remix)
 Irina feat. Dave Aude - "One Last Kiss" (R3hab Club Mix)
 NERVO - "Hold On" (R3hab & Silvio Ecomo Remix)
 Cher - ""Woman's World (R3hab Remix)
 Dan Black feat. Kelis - "Hearts" (Kaskade & R3hab Remix)
 Calvin Harris feat. Ellie Goulding - "I Need Your Love" (R3hab Remix)
 Yoko Ono - "Walking On Thin Ice" (R3hab Remix)

2014
 Tiësto feat. Matthew Koma – "Wasted" (R3hab Remix)
 Beyoncé – "Pretty Hurts" (R3hab Remix)
 Rita Ora – "I Will Never Let You Down" (R3hab Remix)
 My Crazy Girlfriend – "Stupid Love" (R3hab Remix)
 Gareth Emery feat. Krewella – "Lights and Thunder" (R3hab Remix)
 Calvin Harris – "Summer" (R3hab & Ummet Ozcan Remix)
 Darius & Finlay - "And I" (R3hab Remix)
 John Legend – "You & I (Nobody in the World)" (R3hab Remix)
 Calvin Harris feat. John Newman – "Blame" (R3HAB Club Remix)
 Calvin Harris feat. John Newman – "Blame"" (R3HAB Trap Remix)

2015
 Ciara - "I Bet" (R3hab Remix)
 Rihanna - "Bitch Better Have My Money" (R3hab Remix)
 Calvin Harris feat. HAIM - "Pray To God" (R3hab Remix)
 Axwell Λ Ingrosso - "Sun Is Shining" (R3hab Remix)
 Calvin Harris & Disciples - "How Deep Is Your Love" (Calvin Harris & R3hab Remix)
 ZZ Ward - "Love 3X" (R3hab Remix)
 Taylor Swift - "Wildest Dreams" (R3hab Remix)
 Nytrix – "Take Me Higher" (R3hab Remix)
 Bomba Estereo & Will Smith - "Fiesta" (R3hab Remix)

2016
 Rihanna feat. Drake - "Work" (R3hab Remix)
 Rihanna feat. Drake - "Work" (R3hab & Quintino Remix)
 Rihanna - "Kiss It Better" (R3hab Remix)
 Rihanna - "Needed Me" (R3hab Remix)
 Calvin Harris feat. Rihanna - "This Is What You Came For" (R3hab Remix / R3hab & Henry Fong Remix)
 The Chainsmokers feat. Halsey - "Closer" (R3hab Remix)
 Zara Larsson - "Ain't My Fault" (R3hab Remix)
 Major Lazer feat. Justin Bieber & MØ - "Cold Water" (R3hab vs Skytech Remix)
 Zara Larsson - "I Would Like" (R3hab Remix)

2017
 Migos - "Bad & Boujee" (R3hab vs No Riddim & It's Different Remix)
 Ella Vos - "White Noise" (R3hab Remix)
 DJ Snake feat. Justin Bieber - "Let Me Love You" (R3hab Remix)
 The Chainsmokers & Coldplay - "Something Just Like This" (R3hab Remix)
 Maroon 5 feat. Future - "Cold" (R3hab & Khrebto Remix)
 Clean Bandit feat. Zara Larsson - "Symphony" (R3hab remix)
 Bruno Mars - "24K Magic" (R3hab Remix)
 Kygo & Ellie Goulding - "First Time" (R3hab Remix)
 Ella Vos - "You Don't Know About Me" (R3hab Remix)
 Halsey - "Now Or Never" (R3hab Remix)
 Alina Baraz feat. Khalid - "Electric" (R3hab Remix)
 David Guetta feat. Justin Bieber - "2U" (R3hab Remix)
 Miley Cyrus - "Younger Now" (R3hab Remix)
 Dimitri Vegas & Like Mike and David Guetta - "Complicated" (R3hab Remix)
 EXO 엑소 - "Power" (R3hab Remix)
 Sigrid - "Strangers" (R3hab Remix)
 Jessie Ware - "Alone" (R3hab Remix)
 Rita Ora - "Anywhere" (R3hab Remix)
 Matoma feat. Noah Cyrus - "Slow" (R3hab Remix)
 Thirty Seconds To Mars - "Walk On Water" (R3hab Remix)

2018
 Rudimental featuring Jess Glynne, Macklemore and Dan Caplen - "These Days" (R3hab Remix)
 Lauv - "Getting Over You" (R3hab Remix)
 Greyson Chance - "Low" (R3hab Remix)
 Nina Nesbitt - "Somebody Special" (R3hab Remix)
 Marshmello - "Friends" (R3hab Remix)
 Calvin Harris and Dua Lipa - "One Kiss" (R3hab Remix)
 Kiiara - "Messy" (R3hab Remix) 
 5 Seconds of Summer - "Youngblood" (R3hab Remix)
 Mr Probz - "Space For Two"
 Lu Han - "Catch Me When I Fall" (R3hab Remix)
 Dan + Shay - "Tequila" (R3hab Remix)
 Sabrina Carpenter - "Almost Love" (R3hab Remix)
 David Guetta featuring Anne-Marie - "Don't Leave Me Alone" (R3hab Remix)
 Why Don't We - "8 Letters" (R3hab Remix)
 Frank Walker and R3hab featuring Riley Biederer - "Heartbreak Back" (R3hab Remix)
 Jonas Blue feat. Liam Payne and Lennon Stella - "Polaroid" (R3hab Remix)
 Jason Derulo and David Guetta featuring Nicki Minaj and Willy William - "Goodbye" (R3hab Remix)
 Glowie - "Body" (R3hab Remix)
 Charli XCX & Troye Sivan - "1999" (R3hab Remix)
 Nikki Vianna - "Done" (R3hab Remix)

2019
 Andy Grammer - "Don't Give Up On Me" (R3hab Remix)
 For King & Country - "Joy." (R3hab Remix)
 Kygo and Sandro Cavazza - "Happy Now" (R3hab Remix)
 Mabel - "Don't Call Me Up" (R3hab Remix)
 Tom Walker - "Just You and I" (R3hab Remix)
 Ocean Park Standoff - "Good Time" (R3hab Remix)
 Kazka - "Plakala" (R3hab Remix)
 The Chainsmokers featuring 5 Seconds of Summer - "Who Do You Love" (R3hab Remix)
 Digital Farm Animals featuring Danny Ocean - "Lookin' For" (R3hab Remix)
 P!nk - "Walk Me Home" (R3hab Remix)
 Sofi Tukker - "Fantasy" (R3hab Remix)
 For King & Country - "God Only Knows" (R3hab Remix)
 Mitchell Tenpenny - "Drunk Me" (R3hab Remix)
 Rammstein - "Ausländer" (R3hab Remix)
 NOTD and HRVY - "I Miss Myself" (R3hab Remix)
 David Guetta featuring Raye - "Stay" (David Guetta and R3hab Remix)
 Ally Brooke featuring A Boogie Wit Da Hoodie - "Lips Don't Lie" (R3hab Remix)
 Ina Wroldsen - "Forgive or Forget" (R3hab Remix)
 Katy Perry - "Never Really Over" (R3hab Remix)
 Miley Cyrus - "Mother's Daughter (R3hab Remix)
 Léon - "You and I" (R3hab Remix)
 Ellie Goulding and Juice Wrld - "Hate Me" (R3hab Remix)
 James Arthur and Ty Dolla Sign featuring Scotty Boy - "Treehouse" (R3hab Remix)
 For King & Country - "Burn the Ships" (R3hab Remix)
 Dimitri Vegas & Like Mike, David Guetta, Daddy Yankee, Afro Bros, and Natti Natasha - "Instagram" (R3hab Remix)
 Tom Walker – "Better Half of Me" (R3hab Remix)
 UVERworld - "ODD FUTURE (Remixed by R3HAB)"
 JP Cooper, Stefflon Don and Banx & Ranx — "The Reason Why" (R3hab Remix)
 Astrid S — "Favorite Part of Me" (R3hab Remix)

2020
 Arashi - "Turning Up (R3hab Remix)"
 R3hab and Miquela - "Money" (R3hab Remix)
 Connor Bvrns and Bonn - "Anthem" (R3hab Remix)
 Steve Aoki and Maluma - "Maldad" (R3hab Remix)
 Gregory Porter - "Revival" (R3hab Remix)
 Sofia Carson and R3hab - "I Luv U" (R3hab VIP Remix)
 Love Harder featuring Julie Bergan - "Outta My Head" (R3hab Remix)
 Caroline Romano - "I Still Remember" (R3hab Remix)
 Ella Isaacson featuring Galant - "Expectations" (R3hab Remix)
 End of the World featuring Gabrielle Aplin - "Over" (R3hab Remix)
 For King & Country featuring Kirk Franklin and Tori Kelly - "Together" (R3HAB Remix)
 Michele Morrone - "Hard For Me" (R3hab Remix)
 Jason Derulo - "Take You Dancing" (R3hab Remix)
 Wafia - "Good Things" (R3hab Remix)
 Stereo Jane - "I Don't Wanna Talk About Me" (R3hab Remix)
 Steve Malcom and Shaggy - "Fuego" (R3hab Remix)
Weird Genius and Sara Fajira - "Lathi" (R3hab Remix)
 KSI featuring R3hab, Sean Paul, Craig David, Digital Farm Animals) - "Really Love" (R3hab Remix)
 Alan Walker and Salem Ilese - "Fake A Smile" (R3hab Remix)
 Ava Max - "EveryTime I Cry" (R3hab Remix)

2021
 Slander and Dylan Matthew - "Love Is Gone" (R3hab Remix)
 Rauw Alejandro - "Algo Mágico" (R3hab Remix)
 Twice - "Scientist" (R3hab Remix)
 Pitbull featuring Anthony Watts and DJWS - "I Feel Love" (R3hab Remix)
 R3hab and Lukas Graham - "Most People" (R3hab VIP Remix)
 Helene Fischer feat. Luis Fonsi – Vamos a Marte (R3HAB Remix)
2022
 Maisy Kay - "Scared Together" (R3hab Remix)
 For King & Country - "Relate" (R3hab Remix)
 (G)I-dle – "Tomboy" (R3hab Remix)
 EVERGLOW - "Pirate" (R3hab Remix)
 Superfly - "Dynamite" (R3hab Remix)

2023
 Jordana Bryant - "Can I Get It Back" (R3HAB Remix)

Music videos

Notes

References

Discographies of Dutch artists
Electronic music discographies
House music discographies